Víctor Torres Funes (born 31 January 1967) is a Spanish rugby union player. He played as prop.

Career
His first international cap was during a test match against Germany, at Heidelberg, on 26 April 1998. He was in the 1999 Rugby World Cup roster, playing two matches.

External links
 Víctor Torres international statistics

1967 births
Living people
Rugby union props
Spain international rugby union players
Spanish rugby union players